Mefonna is a glacier in Sørkapp Land at Spitsbergen, Svalbard. It has a length of about seven kilometers. The glacier drains both northwards and southwards. In the northern direction, Samarinbreen debouches into Samarinvågen. To the south, Olsokbreen debouches into Stormbukta.

References

Glaciers of Spitsbergen